"Till I Found You" is a song written by Hank DeVito and Paul Kennerley, and recorded by American country music artist Marty Stuart.  It was released in April 1991 as the second single from his album Tempted.  The song reached number 12 on the Billboard Hot Country Singles & Tracks chart in July 1991.

Chart performance

References

1991 singles
Marty Stuart songs
Songs written by Paul Kennerley
Song recordings produced by Tony Brown (record producer)
MCA Records singles
Songs written by Hank DeVito
1991 songs